Nidderau is a town in the Main-Kinzig district, in Hesse, Germany. It is situated approximately 12 km north of Hanau, and 20 km northeast of Frankfurt. Nidderau was created in the merger of the municipality of Heldenbergen with the town of Windecken on January 1, 1970. Eichen and Erbstadt joined Nidderau on January 1, 1972 and Ostheim merged with Nidderau in July 1974.

Gallery

Known personalities 
 Wilhelm Adam (1893-1978), politician and general
 Rodolphe Lindt (1855-1909), chocolate manufacturer
 Lassa Oppenheim (1858-1919), German jurist

References

Towns in Hesse
Main-Kinzig-Kreis